The Nelson Mandela Challenge Plate is a rugby union trophy contested between Australia and South Africa. It is named after South Africa's first democratically elected president, Nelson Mandela.

History
Initially designed to be held every two years, the trophy was first contested as a one-off match in 2000, with Australia winning the game 44-23 at Melbourne's Docklands Stadium. The second, played in Ellis Park, Johannesburg in 2002, was also South Africa's home game in the Tri Nations, and was won 33–31 by South Africa. The 2004 event, delayed until 2005, was played over two legs, and was not part of the Tri Nations. Since South Africa were the holders, Australia needed to win both games to reclaim the trophy. Australia won the first game 30–12, but lost the return leg at Ellis Park, 33–20.

Between 2006 and 2011, with the expansion of the Tri Nations series so that each country plays each other three times, the plate was contested over three Tests, akin to the Bledisloe Cup, with the exception of 2007 and 2011, when teams only played 4 games each, to accommodate for the Rugby World Cups in those years. In 2012, the Tri Nations was expanded to include Argentina and the competition was renamed The Rugby Championship. The teams now play each other twice, and the challengers are required to beat the holders in both games to win the plate.

The trophy is a leather-clad silver plate containing a 24 carat (100%) rim, and a central gold disk showing a Wallaby and a Springbok (the icons of the two teams). It was designed by Flynn Silver, an Australian family company from Kyneton, Victoria.

Matches

Source:

Results

See also

History of rugby union matches between Australia and South Africa

References

External links

2000 establishments in Australia
2000 establishments in South Africa
The Rugby Championship trophies
History of rugby union matches between Australia and South Africa
International rugby union competitions hosted by Australia
International rugby union competitions hosted by South Africa
Plate